is a railway station in Nishiwaki, Hyōgo Prefecture, Japan, operated by West Japan Railway Company (JR West).

Lines
Hon-Kuroda Station is served by the Kakogawa Line.

See also
 List of railway stations in Japan

External links
  

Railway stations in Hyōgo Prefecture
Railway stations in Japan opened in 1924